The Popjustice £20 Music Prize, also known as the Popjustice Twenty Quid Prize, is an annual prize awarded by music website Popjustice to recognise the best British pop single of the previous year. The prize was conceived by Popjustice founder Peter Robinson in 2003 as a reaction to what he perceived as the pompous and elitist nature of the existing Mercury Prize, which recognises the best album of the previous year, and in particular its exclusion of pop music acts in favour of those from more esoteric genres. The shortlist for the Popjustice prize is announced in September of each year and the winner named the following month, to coincide with the presentation of the Mercury Prize. Popjustice gives a token prize of £20 to the winner of its award, in contrast to the £20,000 given to the winner of the Mercury Prize.

The winning entry is chosen by a panel of Popjustice readers, who apply for the position via the website. The judges meet in a pub to debate the merits of the songs shortlisted by Robinson and eliminate them, often based on bizarre or arbitrary criteria, until a winner is chosen. In 2009 Nicola Roberts of Girls Aloud attended the pub in person to collect the prize of a £20 note in a plastic container.

The first prize was awarded to Girls Aloud in 2003 for their single "No Good Advice", and the act went on to win the award four more times over the next six years; no other act had won more than once until Little Mix's second win in 2015 with "Black Magic", the eighth time the award had been won by a British girl group.  Girls Aloud and Little Mix have received the most nominations, with eight apiece. The next highest number of nominations for an act is five for Dua Lipa, Calvin Harris and Mark Ronson.

Recipients

Most nominated artists 
The following have received three or more nominations:

See also
Mercury Music Prize

References

External links
Popjustice.com main page

British music awards